Listed below are the dates and results for the 2002 FIFA World Cup qualification rounds for Asia.

The Asian Football Confederation was allocated four and half qualifying berths for the 2002 FIFA World Cup, South Korea and Japan, the co-hosts, qualified automatically, leaving two and half spots open for competition between 40 teams. Myanmar withdrew from the tournament after being placed in Group 2 but before any matches had been played, therefore reducing the group to 3 teams.

Afghanistan, Bhutan and North Korea chose not to participate.

Asia's two remaining automatic qualifying berths were taken by Saudi Arabia and China.

Iran defeated United Arab Emirates for the chance to become the possible third Asian qualifier, but lost to Ireland in the intercontinental play-off.

There were 588 goals scored in 155 matches (including 2 international play-offs), for an average of 3.79 goals per match.

Tournament structure

There were three rounds of play:First stage: The 39 teams were divided into 9 groups of 4 teams each, and 1 group of 3 teams. The teams played against each other twice, except in Group 2, where the teams played against each other once. The group winners advanced to the Final Round.Second stage: The 10 teams were divided into 2 groups of 5 teams. The teams played against each other on a home-and-away basis. The group winners qualified for the World Cup. The runners-up advanced to the AFC Play-off.Play-off': The 2 teams played against each other on a home-and-away basis. The winner advanced to the UEFA/AFC Intercontinental Play-off.

First round

Group 1

Group 2

Group 3

Group 4

Group 5

Group 6

Group 7

Group 8

Group 9

Group 10

Second round

Group A

Group B

Play-offIran win 4–0 on aggregate and advanced to the UEFA–AFC qualification play-off.''

Intercontinental play-off

Qualified teams
The following four teams from AFC qualified for the final tournament.

1 Bold indicates champions for that year. Italic indicates hosts for that year.

Goalscorers

External links
 FIFA.com Reports
 RSSSF Page

 
FIFA World Cup qualification (AFC)